Iván Raúl Delfino (born 16 August 1971) is an Argentine football manager and former player who played as a defender.

Playing career
Delfino was born in Sunchales, Santa Fe, and made his senior debut with 9 de Julio de Rafaela in 1992. He moved to Banfield during the year, and spent four seasons at the club before signing for El Porvenir.

Delfino helped El Porvenir in their promotion to the Primera B Nacional in 1998, being a regular starter. He left the club in 2002, and subsequently represented second division sides Gimnasia y Esgrima de Jujuy, San Martín de Mendoza and Juventud Antoniana.

In 2006, Delfino joined Libertad Sunchales in the Torneo Argentino B. He retired with the club in the end of the season, aged 35.

Managerial career
Immediately after retiring, Delfino became an assistant manager at his last club Libertad. On 8 January 2008, he was named first team manager in the place of departed Frank Darío Kudelka.

Delfino resigned on 13 December 2011, after eight winless matches. The following 22 February, he took over a club he already represented as a player, Juventud Unida.

On 26 February 2013, Delfino was appointed manager of Crucero del Norte in the second level. He presented his resignation roughly one year later, and was named in charge of Patronato on 18 December 2014.

On 16 December 2015, after achieving promotion to the Primera División with Patronato, Delfino was named at the helm of Temperley also in the top tier. He was sacked by the club the following 3 May, and took over Instituto on 16 June.

Delfino left Instituto on a mutual agreement on 20 April 2017, and was appointed manager of Sarmiento on 7 October. He led the side to the leadership of the 2020 Primera Nacional, but left on 24 December of that year to return to Patronato.

References

External links

1971 births
Living people
Sportspeople from Santa Fe Province
Argentine footballers
Association football defenders
9 de Julio de Rafaela players
Club Atlético Banfield footballers
El Porvenir footballers
Gimnasia y Esgrima de Jujuy footballers
San Martín de Mendoza footballers
Juventud Antoniana footballers
Libertad de Sunchales footballers
Argentine football managers
Argentine Primera División managers
Primera B Nacional managers
Juventud Antoniana managers
Instituto managers
Club Atlético Sarmiento managers
Crucero del Norte managers
Club Atlético Patronato managers